is a biweekly peer-reviewed scientific journal published by Elsevier. It was  established in 1950 and is sponsored by the Geochemical Society and the Meteoritical Society. The editor-in-chief is Jeffrey Catalano (Washington University in St. Louis). The journal covers topics in Earth geochemistry, planetary geochemistry, cosmochemistry and meteoritics.

Publishing formats include original research articles and invited reviews and occasional editorials, book reviews, and announcements. In addition, the journal publishes short comments (4 pages) targeting specific articles and designed to improve understanding of the target article by advocating a different interpretation supported by the literature, followed by a response by the author.

Abstracting and indexing
The journal is abstracted and indexed in:

According to the Journal Citation Reports, the journal has a 2021 impact factor of 5.921.

References

External links

Geochemistry journals
Planetary science journals
Publications established in 1950
Quarterly journals
English-language journals
Elsevier academic journals
Meteoritics publications
Academic journals associated with learned and professional societies
Geochemical Society